Balotlhanyi Johannes (born 28 June 1994) is a Motswana footballer who plays as a defender for Double Action Ladies FC and the Botswana women's national team.

Club career
Johannes has played for Double Action in Botswana.

International career
Johannes capped for Botswana at senior level during the 2016 Africa Women Cup of Nations qualification and the 2021 COSAFA Women's Championship.

See also
List of Botswana women's international footballers

References

External links

1994 births
Living people
People from Gaborone
Botswana women's footballers
Women's association football defenders
Botswana women's international footballers